Brian Michael Daboll (born April 14, 1975) is a Canadian-born American football coach who is the head coach for the New York Giants of the National Football League (NFL). He previously served as the offensive coordinator for the Cleveland Browns, Miami Dolphins, Kansas City Chiefs, Alabama Crimson Tide, and Buffalo Bills. Daboll has also served in various capacities as an assistant coach for the New England Patriots from 2000 to 2006 and again from 2013 to 2016.

Early years
Born in Welland, Ontario, Canada, Daboll was raised by his grandparents in nearby West Seneca, a suburb of Buffalo, New York. Daboll attended Saint Francis High School in Hamburg, New York  and was a letterman in football. He was teammates there with future coach Brian Polian and future NFL front office executive Dave Caldwell. He attended the University of Rochester and was a letterman and two-year starter in football as a safety. Daboll graduated with a degree in economics.

Coaching career

Assistant
Daboll was hired as a restricted earnings coach by the College of William & Mary in 1997 before moving to Michigan State University as a graduate assistant from 1998 to 1999 under head coach Nick Saban.

New England Patriots
Daboll began his NFL coaching career at the age of 24 with the New England Patriots as a defensive coaching assistant in 2000 under new head coach Bill Belichick. After personnel assistant Josh McDaniels was promoted to defensive assistant, Daboll was promoted to wide receivers coach for the Patriots in 2002. After the 2006 season, he left the Patriots to serve as the Jets' quarterbacks coach. The Patriots won three Super Bowls during Daboll's first stint with the Patriots.

New York Jets
In 2007, Daboll joined Eric Mangini's staff with the New York Jets as the quarterbacks' coach. Mangini and Daboll both served as assistants on the Patriots from 2000 to 2005. Daboll coached quarterbacks Chad Pennington, Kellen Clemens, and Brett Favre during his tenure in New York. The Jets fired coach Mangini on December 29, 2008, after the Jets finished 9–7 despite an 8–3 start to the season. Daboll was not retained under new head coach Rex Ryan.

Cleveland Browns
In 2009, Daboll joined the Cleveland Browns as offensive coordinator, reuniting with new head coach Eric Mangini, whom he worked alongside in New England and on the New York Jets. Under Daboll the Browns had the NFL's 32nd ranked offense in 2009 and the 29th ranked offense in 2010.

Miami Dolphins
Daboll was named Offensive Coordinator of the Miami Dolphins under head coach Tony Sparano in 2011, with his Dolphins improving from 30th in the league to 20th in overall offense. The Dolphins fired coach Sparano after the team started 4–9 on December 11, 2011, and Daboll was not retained under new head coach Joe Philbin.

Kansas City Chiefs
On February 6, 2012, the Kansas City Chiefs announced the hiring of Daboll as offensive coordinator, replacing the retired Bill Muir. Daboll was reunited with new head coach Romeo Crennel, with whom Daboll worked on the Patriots from 2001 to 2004. The 2012 Chiefs finished with a league-worst 2–14 record and fired Crennel after just one season as head coach. Daboll was not retained by new head coach Andy Reid.

New England Patriots (second stint)
On January 13, 2013, the New England Patriots announced that Daboll would be brought back in a coaching capacity for the remainder of the Patriots 2012–13 season. Six days later, the Patriots lost to the eventual Super Bowl champion Baltimore Ravens 28–13 in the AFC Championship Game. Daboll served as the Patriots tight ends' coach from 2013 to 2016, coaching Pro Bowl tight end Rob Gronkowski. The Patriots won Super Bowl XLIX and Super Bowl LI during Daboll's second stint in New England.

Alabama
On February 18, 2017, Daboll returned to college football as offensive coordinator for the Alabama Crimson Tide, marking Daboll's first college football coaching stint in 18 years. Daboll was reunited with Alabama head coach Nick Saban, for whom he had worked while Saban was the head coach of Michigan State. He helped Alabama reach the 2018 National Championship Game, where the Tide defeated the Georgia Bulldogs in overtime. He coached quarterbacks Jalen Hurts and Tua Tagovailoa during his lone season in Alabama.

Buffalo Bills
On January 4, 2018, Daboll was named the new offensive coordinator for his hometown team, the Buffalo Bills, under head coach Sean McDermott. Daboll is credited in part with the development of quarterback Josh Allen, whom many scouts saw as a "project" coming out of college. In 2020, Daboll's third season with the Bills, Allen set numerous passing records for the Bills, and the Bills' offense as a whole improved significantly, finishing second that year with 31.3 points per game. The team finished with 13 wins for the first time since 1991, won their first division title and playoff game since 1995, and made their first AFC Championship Game since 1993, in which they lost to the Kansas City Chiefs 38-24. For his work, Daboll won the Associated Press NFL Assistant Coach of the Year Award for the 2020 season.

Head coach

New York Giants
Daboll was hired as the New York Giants' 20th head coach on January 28, 2022. Daboll's debut as head coach came in a 21–20 victory over the Tennessee Titans. Daboll's Giants got off to a 7–2 start to the season, their best start in a decade, and on January 1, 2023, they defeated the Indianapolis Colts 38–10, and clinched their first playoff berth since 2016. The team finished the regular season at 9–7–1, earning the sixth seed in the NFC for the 2022–23 NFL playoffs. They defeated the Minnesota Vikings 31–24 in the NFC Wild Card Round, their first postseason victory since winning Super Bowl XLVI in 2012.

Their season, however, would come to an end in the  Divisional Round with a loss to their rivals, the  Philadelphia Eagles by a score of 38–7.

Brian Daboll was named the Associated Press 2022 NFL Coach of the Year honor with his successful first season as head coach with the Giants.

Head coaching record

References

External links

 New York Giants profile

1975 births
Living people
Alabama Crimson Tide football coaches
American football safeties
Buffalo Bills coaches
Cleveland Browns coaches
Kansas City Chiefs coaches
Miami Dolphins coaches
Michigan State Spartans football coaches
National Football League offensive coordinators
New England Patriots coaches
New York Giants coaches
New York Giants head coaches
New York Jets coaches
Rochester Yellowjackets football players
Sportspeople from Welland
William & Mary Tribe football coaches